Suego Faults is the first studio album by the British band Wolf Gang. It was released on 25 July 2011 in the United Kingdom and as a digital album on 20 December 2011 in the United States. The album included the singles "Lions in Cages", "The King and All of His Men" and "Dancing with the Devil".

Production history
All of the album's tracks were written by Wolf Gang's songwriter and lead vocalist, Max McElligott. Suego Faults was produced by Dave Fridmann.

Reception

Duncan Gillespie of NME gave the album 4 out of a possible 5 stars, calling it "a sparkling debut album with echoes of Byrne and Bowie".

Track listing

Personnel
 Max McElligott – lead vocals
 Lasse Petersen – drums 
 Gavin Slater – guitar
 James Wood – bass guitar
 Jamie Jones – keyboard

Charts

References

2011 debut albums
Albums produced by Dave Fridmann
Wolf Gang albums
Albums recorded at Tarbox Road Studios